Frederick Augustus Packer (1839–1902) was an Australian composer of Anglican spiritual and romantic music. He was born in Reading, Berkshire, in the United Kingdom He worked as a parliamentary civil servant and music teacher. He was a nephew to fellow composer Charles Sandys Packer and a postal telegraph operator. He came from a musical family  He died after some years in Sydney 
He was an uncle to media mogul R. C. Packer.

Works
 1800s For the old love's sake
 1879 Under The Snow
 1880 Listening
 Is my lover on the sea
 The Garrison polka
 Violette : I dream of thee 
 Nearer to Thee (hymn 114)
 Withered (sunshine through rain) song
 1890 Susie Bell

Recordings
 2011 Songs of Fred Packer by Kerry Garland 
 2015 When the Wattles Was in Bloom
 2016 Three pieces of Frederick A. Packer: Sion Reade concert band

References

1839 births
1902 deaths
Australian conductors (music)
Australian male composers
Australian composers
English emigrants to Australia
Australian poets
Packer family
English Anglicans
People from Reading, Berkshire
Romantic composers
19th-century Australian businesspeople
19th-century male musicians
20th-century Australian male musicians
20th-century Australian musicians